Weifang Nanyuan Airport is an airport in Weifang, Shandong, People’s Republic of China .

Airlines and destinations

See also
List of airports in the People's Republic of China

References

Airports in Shandong